Olli Kanervisto, born 23 March 1958 in Turku, Finland, died 8 April 1984 in Playa del Ingles, Spain, was a Finnish shot putter. He participated the 1983 European Athletics Indoor Championships in Budapest where he finished seventh. His personal best throw was 19,24 metres in 1982.

Death 
Kanervisto was killed by an off-duty Spanish police officer in a shooting incident that occurred outside a local night club in Playa del Ingles, Spain. The officer was sentenced to 14 months in prison for a manslaughter of unsound mind.

Honors 
Finnish indoor championship: 1983, 1984

References 

1958 births
1984 deaths
Sportspeople from Turku
Finnish male shot putters
Finnish people murdered abroad
Male murder victims
Deaths by firearm in Spain
People shot dead by law enforcement officers
20th-century Finnish people
Manslaughter victims